Westhampton is a station along the Montauk Branch of the Long Island Rail Road. It is on Station Road and Depot Road in Westhampton, New York, just west of Old Riverhead Road and south of the Francis S. Gabreski Airport.

History 

Westhampton station was originally built between February and March 1870 along what was then the Sag Harbor Branch. In 1905 a second station was built when the first one was moved to a private location. The station burned down in 1986, but was rebuilt sometime between then and the year 2000. Currently the station has a high-level sheltered platform. When Quogue station was closed on March 16, 1998, Westhampton was one of the two stations that replaced it. The other was Hampton Bays.

Station layout
The station has one eight-car-long high-level side platform on the south side of the main track. A siding is on the north side of the main track.

References

External links 

February 2000 Photo (Unofficial LIRR History Website)
Station entrance from Google Maps Street View

Long Island Rail Road stations in Suffolk County, New York
The Hamptons, New York
Railway stations in the United States opened in 1870
1870 establishments in New York (state)